Love Nights in the Taiga (German: Liebesnächte in der Taiga) is a 1967 West German thriller film directed by Harald Philipp and starring Thomas Hunter, Marie Versini and Stanislav Ledinek. It is also known by the alternative title of Code Name Kill.

The film's sets were designed by the art director Robert Stratil. It is an adaptation of the 1966 novel of the same title by Heinz G. Konsalik.

Synopsis
At the height of the Cold War, the CIA send a Russian-speaking Baltic German to the Soviet Union disguised as a Swiss fashion journalist. His real mission is to gather intelligence on a missile base in Siberia located amongst the taiga. He receives assistance from a Soviet woman who falls in love with him.

Cast
 Thomas Hunter as Frank Heller 
 Marie Versini as Ludmilla Barankova 
 Stanislav Ledinek as Colonel Karpuchin 
 Ivan Desny as Colonel Kirk 
 Rolf Boysen as Karpuchin 
 Biggi Freyer as Marta Barinskaya 
 Hellmut Lange as Captain Jimmy Braddock 
 Walter Barnes as Jurij 
 Magda Konopka as Bibi Randall 
 Christiane Nielsen as Tanja 
 Kurd Pieritz as Kusnezoff
 Sandra Prinsloo as Nadja 
 Marius Weyers as Markjoff

References

Bibliography 
 Peter Cowie & Derek Elley. World Filmography: 1967. Fairleigh Dickinson University Press, 1977.

External links 
 

1967 films
1960s spy thriller films
German spy thriller films
West German films
1960s German-language films
Films directed by Harald Philipp
Films about the Central Intelligence Agency
Films based on German novels
Films set in the Soviet Union
Cold War spy films
1960s German films